The Men's artistic team all-around gymnastics competition at the 2022 Commonwealth Games in Birmingham, England was held on 29 July 2022 at Arena Birmingham.

This event also determined the qualification standings for the individual all-around and apparatus finals.

Schedule
The schedule was as follows:

All times are British Summer Time (UTC+1)

Results

Team competition
The results are as follows:

Qualification results

Individual all-around

The results are as follows:

Floor

The results are as follows:

Pommel horse

The results are as follows:

Rings

The results are as follows:

Vault

The results are as follows:

Parallel bars

The results are as follows:

Horizontal bar

The results are as follows:

References

Men's